A storytelling festival is an event that features local, regional and/or nationally known oral storytellers. Each storyteller will have a scheduled amount of time to share a story (or stories) with an audience. The featured storytellers are often professional performing artists, but semi-professional or amateur storytellers may also be included among the events.

A festival may be a single or multiple day event. Depending upon the venue, the festival schedule is organized around blocks of time for the storytellers to share their stories. The storytellers may rotate between smaller venues or the crowds may move from venue to venue. Often storytelling festivals will include an open mic event, sometimes referred to as "story swapping," where amateurs from the audience may share their own stories. Some festivals showcase the winners of storytelling contests such as the Young Storyteller of the Year.

At some festivals (including the National Storytelling Festival (USA)), paper tickets are substituted by "swatches" of patterned cloth that are pinned on and worn by festival participants. These swatches of cloth have a different/unique pattern each year and various colors may be used to distinguish the level of participation.

List

See also
Oral storytelling - some history of festivals
World Storytelling Day - international storytelling day with small festivals

References

External links 
Storytelling festivals List of and links to storytelling festivals (USA and International)

The National Storytelling Network (USA)
Audio interviews and articles on How to run a storytelling festival.  (USA)
Storytellers of Canada/Conteurs du Canada
East Tennessee State Reading/Storytelling Program Only university in US to offer an MA Reading/Storytelling program
  Storytellers and Storytelling in India

Arts festivals by type